The 2019 Copa Paulino Alcantara was the second edition of the Copa Paulino Alcantara, the domestic football cup competition of the Philippines. It included 6 out of 7 Philippines Football League teams as well as a guest team, the Philippines U22. It started on October 26, 2019, and concluded on November 16, 2019, with Ceres-Negros beating Kaya-Iloilo in the final, 2–1.

Participating clubs 
All seven clubs of the 2019 Philippines Football League are eligible to participate in the tournament. However, Global Makati which was undergoing a reorganization, pulled out of the tournament. A guest team, the Philippines U-22, competed in the tournament as preparation for the upcoming 2019 Southeast Asian Games

Format

Competition 
The Copa Paulino Alcantara commenced on October 26, 2019 with a group phase of two groups with four teams each. A round robin format was used for this phase. The top two teams advanced to the semifinals with the group winners facing the runner-up team from the other group. The higher seeded teams hosted the one-off semifinals. The final consist of a single match as well.

Draw 
The draw for the 2019 Copa Paulino Alcantara was held on October 20, 2019. Due to Global's sudden backing out, one group will have 3 teams while the other will have 4. The top 2 teams of the 2019 Philippines Football League season, namely Ceres-Negros and Kaya-Iloilo are the two seeded teams. The other five will be in pot 2.

Group stage

Group A

Group B

Knock-out stage

Bracket

Semi-finals

Final

Top scorers

Awards

Source:

References 

2019
Copa Paulino Alcantara
Philippines